Glen Iris may refer to:

Glen Iris, Victoria, Australia
Glen Iris, Western Australia
Glen Iris Estate, owned by William Pryor Letchworth
Village at Glen Iris, Houston